Robert Leroux (born 22 August 1967) is a French fencer. He won a bronze medal in the team épée event at the 1996 Summer Olympics.

References

External links
 

1967 births
Living people
French male épée fencers
Olympic fencers of France
Fencers at the 1992 Summer Olympics
Fencers at the 1996 Summer Olympics
Olympic bronze medalists for France
Olympic medalists in fencing
Sportspeople from Casablanca
Medalists at the 1996 Summer Olympics
Universiade medalists in fencing
Universiade bronze medalists for France